Oregon v. Bradshaw, 462 U.S. 1039 (1983), applied the rule first announced in Edwards v. Arizona (1981) and clarified the manner in which a suspect may waive his right under Miranda v. Arizona (1966) to have counsel present during interrogation by the police.

Facts
In September 1980, the police were investigating the death of Lowell Reynolds in Tillamook County, Oregon. It appeared that Reynolds had been killed in a traffic accident, when the truck in which he was a passenger careened off the road and into a creek. Defendant Bradshaw was taken into custody as the suspected driver at the time of the accident. At the station, Bradshaw was read the Miranda warnings, and then admitted furnishing alcohol to Reynolds for a party at Reynolds's house but denied being involved in the traffic accident. The police then arrested Bradshaw for furnishing liquor to Reynolds, a minor, and then the police officer who was questioning Bradshaw explained his theory of how Reynolds was killed. The officer said that he believed Bradshaw was driving the truck in which Reynolds was killed. Bradshaw again denied involvement in Reynolds's death. Then he said, "I do want an attorney before it goes very much further." The officer ended the questioning.

Bradshaw was then taken from the police station to the county jail. Either before they left the station, or en route to the jail, Bradshaw asked, "Well, what is going to happen to me now?" The officer replied, "You do not have to talk to me. You have requested an attorney and I don't want you talking to me unless you so desire because anything you say—because—since you have requested an attorney, you know, it has to be at your own free will." A conversation then followed in which the officer suggested his theory of how Bradshaw had caused Reynolds' death and then suggested that Bradshaw take a lie detector test to clear things up. Bradshaw agreed and the next day, after he was read his Miranda rights, Bradshaw took the lie detector test. At the end, the polygraph examiner informed Bradshaw that the results of the test indicated that he had not been truthful in his responses, it was at this point that Bradshaw admitted to being the driver of the truck at the time of the accident. Oregon v. Bradshaw, 462 U.S. 1039, 1039 (1983).

Plurality opinion
To decide this case, the Court had to determine whether the Oregon Court of Appeals had correctly applied Edwards v. Arizona, . In Edwards, the Court had held that "an accused, having expressed his desire to deal with the police only through counsel, is not subject to further interrogation by the authorities until counsel has been made available to him, unless the accused himself initiates further communication, exchanges, or conversations with the police." The question presented in this case was the effect of Bradshaw's query, "Well, what is going to happen to me now?"

The Oregon Court of Appeals had concluded that Bradshaw had waived his right to counsel when he asked what would happen to him. This, the Court concluded, was not how the Edwards rule should be applied. Edwards was meant to protect an accused from being badgered by the police. Hence, if the accused himself approaches the police, this suggests that the accused may not be being badgered, so that when the police respond to the accused's queries with questions of their own, a reviewing court can decide, based on the totality of the circumstances, whether the accused had waived his Fifth Amendment rights during interrogation. In other words, an accused does not waive his right to counsel during interrogation merely because, after invoking that right, he approaches the police with questions of his own.

Bradshaw's question here, "Well, what is going to happen to me now?", "initiated" conversation with the police "in the ordinary dictionary sense of the word." It "evinced a willingness and a desire for a generalized discussion about the investigation; it was not merely a necessary inquiry arising out of the incidents of the custodial relationship." Thus, a suspect detained during an investigation may, after invoking his right to have counsel present during an interrogation, may ask for a drink of water or to use the telephone without retreating from his prior request for counsel. He may not, however, ask more generalized and open-ended questions. Accordingly, the Court held that the Edwards rule had not been violated. The police did not otherwise make any threats, promises, or inducements to Bradshaw in order to persuade him to talk; in fact they confirmed that he had the right to counsel before resuming their questioning. Under these circumstances, Bradshaw had voluntarily waived his right to counsel during interrogation.

Concurring opinion
Justice Powell agreed that, in this particular case, Bradshaw had voluntarily waived his right to have counsel present during interrogation because, after Bradshaw had asked what would happen to him, the police confirmed that he understood his Miranda rights before having Bradshaw sign a written waiver form. In these circumstances, Powell concluded that Bradshaw had voluntarily waived his right to counsel.

Powell had expressly not joined the opinion in Edwards because he was "not sure what it meant." Powell felt that what it meant to "initiate" conversation with the police was far from clear, and the fact that two plausible meanings each garnered the votes of four Justices in this case. Powell was uncomfortable with the two-part test the plurality had adopted, under which a reviewing court first asked whether the suspect had initiated conversation with the police before asking whether, under the totality of the circumstances, the suspect had waived his right to counsel. Powell pointed out that only the totality-of-the-circumstances test had historically been the only test the Court had employed in the past, and he saw no reason to depart from it.

Dissenting opinion
Justice Marshall argued that the plurality had misapplied Edwards. "When this Court in Edwards spoke of 'initiat[ing] further communication' with the police and 'reopen[ing] the dialogue with the authorities,' it obviously had in mind communication or dialogue about the subject matter of the criminal investigation." If a suspect is not inviting further questioning about the criminal case at hand, he is not acceding to further "interrogation" as Edwards and Miranda contemplated.  If "interrogation" had any broader meaning, then the protections of Edwards and Miranda would be diluted.

Under the facts of this case, Marshall could not understand how Bradshaw's question was meant to express a desire to speak about the criminal case at hand. "If [Bradshaw's] question had been posed by Jean-Paul Sartre before a class of philosophy students, it might well have evinced a desire for a 'generalized' discussion. But under the circumstances of this case, it is plain that [Bradshaw's] only 'desire' was to find out where the police were going to take him." For Marshall, Bradshaw's question was nothing more than a response to custodial surroundings. "The very essence of custody is the loss of control over one's freedom of movement." If the police could exploit such questions as the one Bradshaw asked to ask further questions of an accused in the face of an express desire to have a lawyer present, the protections of Miranda would dissipate.

See also
 List of United States Supreme Court cases, volume 462

External links
 

United States Supreme Court cases
Miranda warning case law
1983 in United States case law
United States Supreme Court cases of the Burger Court